The 2021 PDC Unicorn Challenge Tour were a series of events that were part of the 2021 PDC Pro Tour.

Following the COVID-19 pandemic, it was decided that both the Challenge Tour and the Development Tour would be split, with there being 12 events for UK-based players, and 12 for EU-based players.

The winners of each would earn a PDC Tour Card, qualify for the 2022 PDC World Darts Championship, as well as earn a place at the 2021 Grand Slam of Darts.

Prize money
The prize money for the Challenge Tour events remained the same from 2020, with each event having a prize fund of £10,000.

This is how the prize money is divided:

UK Challenge Tour

UK Challenge Tour 1 
UK Challenge Tour 1 was contested on Friday 6 August 2021 at the Marshall Arena in Milton Keynes.

UK Challenge Tour 2
UK Challenge Tour 2 was contested on Friday 6 August 2021 at the Marshall Arena in Milton Keynes.

UK Challenge Tour 3 
UK Challenge Tour 3 was contested on Saturday 7 August 2021 at the Marshall Arena in Milton Keynes.

UK Challenge Tour 4
UK Challenge Tour 4 was contested on Saturday 7 August 2021 at the Marshall Arena in Milton Keynes.

UK Challenge Tour 5 
UK Challenge Tour 5 was contested on Sunday 8 August 2021 at the Marshall Arena in Milton Keynes.

UK Challenge Tour 6
UK Challenge Tour 6 was contested on Sunday 8 August 2021 at the Marshall Arena in Milton Keynes.

UK Challenge Tour 7 
UK Challenge Tour 7 was contested on Friday 3 September 2021 at the Marshall Arena in Milton Keynes.

UK Challenge Tour 8
UK Challenge Tour 8 was contested on Friday 3 September 2021 at the Marshall Arena in Milton Keynes.

UK Challenge Tour 9 
UK Challenge Tour 9 was contested on Saturday 4 September 2021 at the Marshall Arena in Milton Keynes.

UK Challenge Tour 10
UK Challenge Tour 10 was contested on Saturday 4 September 2021 at the Marshall Arena in Milton Keynes.

UK Challenge Tour 11 
UK Challenge Tour 11 was contested on Sunday 5 September 2021 at the Marshall Arena in Milton Keynes.

UK Challenge Tour 12
UK Challenge Tour 12 was contested on Sunday 5 September 2021 at the Marshall Arena in Milton Keynes.

European Challenge Tour

European Challenge Tour 1 
European Challenge Tour 1 was contested on Friday 2 July 2021 at the H+ Hotel in Niedernhausen.

European Challenge Tour 2
European Challenge Tour 2 was contested on Friday 2 July 2021 at the H+ Hotel in Niedernhausen.

European Challenge Tour 3 
European Challenge Tour 3 was contested on Saturday 3 July 2021 at the H+ Hotel in Niedernhausen.

European Challenge Tour 4
European Challenge Tour 4 was contested on Saturday 3 July 2021 at the H+ Hotel in Niedernhausen.

European Challenge Tour 5 
European Challenge Tour 5 was contested on Sunday 4 July 2021 at the H+ Hotel in Niedernhausen.

European Challenge Tour 6
European Challenge Tour 6 was contested on Sunday 4 July 2021 at the H+ Hotel in Niedernhausen.

European Challenge Tour 7 
European Challenge Tour 7 was contested on Friday 3 September 2021 at the H+ Hotel in Niedernhausen.

European Challenge Tour 8
European Challenge Tour 8 was contested on Friday 3 September 2021 at the H+ Hotel in Niedernhausen.

European Challenge Tour 9 
European Challenge Tour 9 was contested on Saturday 4 September 2021 at the H+ Hotel in Niedernhausen.

European Challenge Tour 10
European Challenge Tour 10 was contested on Saturday 4 September 2021 at the H+ Hotel in Niedernhausen.

European Challenge Tour 11 
European Challenge Tour 11 was contested on Sunday 5 September 2021 at the H+ Hotel in Niedernhausen.

European Challenge Tour 12
European Challenge Tour 12 was contested on Sunday 5 September 2021 at the H+ Hotel in Niedernhausen.

References

2021 in darts
2021 PDC Pro Tour